Hotel Tobruk  is a historic hotel in Tobruk, Libya.

History 

The hotel Tobruk was built in 1937. It was located at the entrance of the port, the last stop before the Egyptian border.

It provided shelter for Erwin Rommel during the Siege of Tobruk in World War II.

Description 

The hotel Tobruk had 20 rooms and an air-conditioning system.

References

Hotels in Tobruk
Hotels established in 1937
Hotel Tobruk
1937 establishments in Libya